Charles-Louis Seck (born 11 May 1965) is a retired Senegalese athlete who competed in the 100 metres.

Achievements

External links

1965 births
Living people
Senegalese male sprinters
Athletes (track and field) at the 1984 Summer Olympics
Athletes (track and field) at the 1988 Summer Olympics
Athletes (track and field) at the 1992 Summer Olympics
Olympic athletes of Senegal
African Games bronze medalists for Senegal
African Games medalists in athletics (track and field)
Athletes (track and field) at the 1987 All-Africa Games
World Athletics Championships athletes for Senegal